The Nara are an ethnic group inhabiting southwestern Eritrea. The society is divided into four subtribes, who are traditionally animist. They are mostly subsistence farmers.

Overview
According to the Eritrean government, the Nara are descendants of the first Nilo-Saharan settlers in Eritrea, who had migrated from the Upper Nile area and intermarried with local Pygmy populations.

Today, the Nara number around 108,000 individuals. They constitute around 1.5% of the population of Eritrea. They are typically agrarian and have settled primarily along the border with Sudan.

They area located north of the Kunama, in the western parts of Barka Plains, the Nara constitute about 1.5% of the Eritrean population.

The Nara population is divided into four subtribes: the Higir, Mogareb, Koyta and Santora. They traditionally adhered to animist beliefs. By the 15th century the Nara were introduced to Islam and after the Egyptian occupation in the 19th century, most Nara adopted Islam.

The Nara ethnonym means "Sky Heaven". They also used to call themselves the Barya.

Language
The Nara people speak the Nara language. Through contact with neighboring Afroasiatic-speaking populations, many Nara are also bilingual in Tigre and/or Arabic. They traditionally had no writing system, with the few existing pieces of literature in Nara transcribed using the writing system of either Tigre or Arabic.

The language is also known as Nara-Bana, meaning "Nara-Talk".

Social organization
Social organisation of the Nara people is based on the clan and subclan, with people living in villages and hamlets. The lineage system is patrilineal, unlike that of the Kunama people. Land belongs to the clan and shared out among the families in the clan.

Genetics
According to Trombetta et al. (2015), 60% of Nara are carriers of the E1b1b paternal haplogroup. Of these, around 13% bear the V32 subclade, to which belong 60% of the Tigre Semitic speakers in Eritrea. This points to substantial gene flow from neighbouring Afro-Asiatic-speaking males into the Nara's ancestral community. Cruciani et al. (2010) likewise observed that the remaining Nara individuals are primarily carriers of the Afro-Asiatic-associated haplogroup J (20%), as well as the A lineage (20%), which is instead common among Nilotes.

References

Ethnic groups in Eritrea
Muslim communities in Africa